The Șes is a left tributary of the river Râul Mare in Romania. It discharges into the Gura Apelor reservoir, which is drained by the Râul Mare.

Tributaries
The following rivers are tributaries to the river Șes:

Left: Șcheiu, Mătania, Baicu, Zeicu
Right: Pârâul Morii, Gugu, Mierla

References

Rivers of Romania
Rivers of Caraș-Severin County
Rivers of Hunedoara County